The 1968 Meriden by-election was a by-election held for the British House of Commons constituency of Meriden in Warwickshire on 28 March 1968.  It was won by the Conservative Party candidate Keith Speed.

Vacancy 
The seat had become vacant when the 38-year-old Labour incumbent Member of Parliament (MP), Christopher Rowland died on 5 November 1967 of pneumonia following a brief illness. He had held the seat since the 1964 general election.

Result 
The result was a clear victory for Speed in what had been a Labour marginal seat. It was one of three Conservative by-election gains from Labour on the same day, the others being at Acton and Dudley.

Speed held the seat until the February 1974 general election, when he lost the seat back to Labour. He went on to be MP for Ashford.

Votes

See also
Meriden constituency
List of United Kingdom by-elections

References 

Meriden by-election
Meriden by-election
20th century in Warwickshire
Politics of Solihull
By-elections to the Parliament of the United Kingdom in Warwickshire constituencies
Meriden by-election